Mobil Bistcho Airport  is located south of Bistcho Lake, Alberta, Canada.

It is located along the 31st baseline in Northern Alberta. Alberta Environment and Parks, Forestry and Emergency Response Division, High Level, operates the airstrip and maintains a remote forward basecamp and fuel cache for staging wildland firefighting operations out of. This camp contains tent frames and a kitchen area. Wildland firefighting crews are regularly posted here on a temporary basis, when the fire hazard gets high and forest fire starts are anticipated.

References

Registered aerodromes in Alberta
Mackenzie County